General elections were held in Bolivia on 7 May 1989. As no candidate for the presidency received over 50% of the vote, the National Congress was required to elect a President on 6 August. Although the Revolutionary Nationalist Movement had received the most votes, its candidate for President Gonzalo Sánchez de Lozada was defeated by Jaime Paz Zamora of the Revolutionary Left Movement (MIR) in the Congressional vote, despite the MIR only finishing third in the public vote.

Campaign
In the initial months of 1989, the Revolutionary Nationalist Movement (MNR) tried in vain to postpone the election date, arguing that the deadline for electoral registration restricted citizen participation. In December 1988, the party's delegation in Congress had managed to amend the electoral law of 1986. Arguing that the new registration requirements, which limited registration to citizens who possessed cédulas de identidad (national identity cards), constituted a violation of universal suffrage, the MNR pushed through legislation that added birth certificates and military service cards as valid registration documents. Nationalist Democratic Action (ADN) refused to go along with its ally and eventually charged the MNR with conducting fraudulent registrations. By mid-February this issue had triggered the rupture of the pacto.

The end of the pacto revealed an old reality about Bolivian politics. To achieve power, broad electoral alliances must be established; yet, electoral alliances have never translated into stable or effective ruling coalitions. On the contrary, electoral alliances have exacerbated the tensions built into a complex system. Thus, once in power, whoever controls the executive must search for mechanisms or coalitions such as the pacto to be able to govern. This search was the single most important challenge facing Bolivian politicians into the 1980s.

As expected, every political party was forced to scramble for new allies. The ADN joined forces with the now minuscule Christian Democrats by naming Luis Ossio as Banzer's running mate in an effort to attract other political elements. Banzer led every major poll, and the ADN repeatedly called for Congress to respect the first majority to emerge from the May 7 election.

The situation was more complex in the MNR where, after a bitter internal struggle, Gonzalo Sánchez de Lozada, a pragmatic former Minister of Planning and Coordination and prominent entrepreneur, captured the party's nomination. The MNR's strategy was to develop Sánchez de Lozada's image as a veteran movimientista (movement leader) to capture populist support. At the same time, party strategists intended to attract support from outside the party by building on the candidate's entrepreneurial background. The task of converting the candidate into an old party member apparently succeeded: old-line populist politicians dominated the first slots on the party's legislative lists. The naming of former President Walter Guevara Arze as the vice presidential candidate was perceived as further evidence of the party's success in influencing the candidate.

Following a similar electoral logic, the MIR sought to broaden its base of support by establishing ties with several parties, including Carlos Serrate Reich's 9 April Revolutionary Vanguard, the Revolutionary Front of the Left, and a number of dissidents from the MNRI. Paz Zamora, the MIR's candidate, led in some polls, and most analysts agreed that he would pose a significant threat to the MNR and ADN.

The left attempted a comeback following the disastrous experience of the UDP years. Headed by Antonio Aranibar's Free Bolivia Movement, the left grouped into a broad front labelled the United Left (IU). The IU brought together splinter factions of the MIR, the Socialist Party-1, and the Communist Party, and it counted on the support of organized labor, especially the COB. Given the historical divisions within the Bolivian left, however, the IU was not perceived to be a serious contender. If it could maintain unity beyond the 1989 elections, observers believed that its impact might be greater than anticipated.

The main newcomer to national electoral politics, although no stranger to La Paz politics, was Carlos Palenque. Popularly known as el compadre (the comrade), Palenque was a former folksinger turned radio and television owner and talk show host. His "popular" style of broadcasting had always enjoyed widespread appeal in the working-class and marginal neighborhoods surrounding La Paz. For at least a decade, Palenque had been regarded as a possible candidate for mayor of La Paz; during the 1987 municipal elections, his name was under consideration by the MNR.

Palenque's move into national politics was prompted by the closing down of his television station for airing accusations made by an infamous drug trafficker, Roberto Suárez Goméz, against the Bolivian government. To promote his candidacy, Palenque founded Conscience of the Fatherland (Conciencia de la Patria—Condepa), which grouped together a bizarre strain of disaffected leftists, populists, and nationalists who had defected from several other parties.

Ten parties and fronts contested the election, which was held as scheduled on May 7, 1989. The results, a virtual three-way tie among the MNR, ADN, and MIR, were not surprising. As expected, Congress once again was given the task of electing the next president from the top three contenders. But the slight majority (a mere 5,815 votes) obtained by the MNR's candidate, Sánchez de Lozada, was surprising to observers, as was the unexpected victory by Palenque in La Paz Department. His showing was significant in a number of ways. First, it demonstrated that none of the major political parties had been able to attract lower middle-class and proletarian urban groups, who had flocked to el compadre; Palenque had wisely targeted marginal and displaced sectors of La Paz. Second, Condepa's showing reflected the growth of racial and ethnic tension in Bolivian electoral politics. For the first time in the history of the Bolivian Congress, for example, a woman dressed in native garb would serve as a deputy for La Paz Department.

Claims of fraud from every contender, especially in the recounting of the votes, clouded the legitimacy of the process. At one stage, fearing an agreement between the ADN and MIR, the MNR called for the annulment of the elections. Indeed, negotiations were well advanced between the MIR and ADN to upstage the relative victory obtained by the MNR. Between May and early August, the top three finishers bargained and manipulated in an attempt to secure control of the executive branch.

The composition of Congress exacerbated the tensions between the parties in contention. Because seventy-nine seats are needed to elect a president, compromise was indispensable. In mid-1989, however, it was unclear whether the political system in Bolivia had matured enough to allow for compromise.

Results

By department

Congressional ballot
MIR's Paz Zamora was supported by Nationalist Democratic Action and Conscience of Fatherland, whilst the MNR's Sánchez was not supported by any other party. The United Left abstained from the vote. For the support of the ADN, the MIR chose to elect Hugo Banzer's running mate Luis Ossio (PDC) as vice president rather than Gustavo Fernández Saavedra, Paz Zamora's running mate.

See also
Bolivian National Congress, 1989–1993

Notes

References

Bibliography 

 

1989 in Bolivia
Elections in Bolivia
1989 elections in South America
1989